Michael Joseph Sandel (born March 5, 1953) is an American political philosopher and the Anne T. and Robert M. Bass Professor of Government Theory at Harvard Law School, where his course Justice was the university's first course to be made freely available online and on television. It has been viewed by tens of millions of people around the world, including in China, where Sandel was named the 2011's "most influential foreign figure of the year" (China Newsweek). He is also known for his critique of John Rawls' A Theory of Justice in his first book, Liberalism and the Limits of Justice (1982). He was elected a Fellow of the American Academy of Arts and Sciences in 2002.

Early life and education
Sandel was born in 1953 into a Jewish family, which moved to Los Angeles when he was thirteen. He was president of his senior class at Palisades High School and graduated Phi Beta Kappa from Brandeis University with a bachelor's degree in politics in 1975. He received his doctorate from Balliol College, Oxford, in 1985, as a Rhodes Scholar, where he studied under philosopher Charles Taylor.

Philosophical views
Sandel subscribes to a certain version of communitarianism (although he is uncomfortable with the label), and in this vein he is perhaps best known for his critique of John Rawls's A Theory of Justice. Rawls's argument depends on the assumption of the veil of ignorance, which Sandel argues commits Rawls to a view of people as "unencumbered selves".

Sandel's view is that we are by nature encumbered to an extent that makes it impossible even hypothetically to have such a veil. Some examples of such ties are those with our families, which we do not make by conscious choice but are born with, already attached. Because they are not consciously acquired, it is impossible to separate oneself from such ties.  Sandel believes that only a less-restrictive, looser version of the veil of ignorance should be postulated. Criticism such as Sandel's inspired Rawls to subsequently argue that his theory of justice was not a "metaphysical" theory but a "political" one, a basis on which an overriding consensus could be formed among individuals and groups with many different moral and political views.

Teaching

Justice
Sandel joined the Faculty of Arts and Sciences at Harvard University in 1981. He has taught the Justice course at Harvard University for two decades. More than 15,000 students have taken the course, making it one of the most highly attended in Harvard's history. The fall 2007 class was the largest ever at Harvard, with a total of 1,115 students. The fall 2005 course was recorded, and is offered online for students through the Harvard Extension School.

An abridged form of this recording is now a 12-episode TV series, Justice: What's the Right Thing to Do?, in a co-production of WGBH and Harvard University. Episodes are available on the Justice with Michael Sandel website. There is also an accompanying book, Justice: What's the Right Thing to Do? and the sourcebook of readings Justice: A Reader.

The popularity of the show is attributed to the discussion-oriented format (the Socratic method)—rather than recitation and memorization of facts—and to Sandel's engaging style, incorporating context into discussion; for example, he starts one lecture with a discussion of the ethics of ticket scalping.

The BBC broadcast eight 30-minute segments from the series on BBC Four starting on 25 January 2011.

In April 2012, BBC Radio 4 broadcast a three-part series and later podcast presented by Sandel titled The Public Philosopher. These followed a format similar to the Justice lectures, this time recorded in front of an audience at the London School of Economics. Across three programs, Sandel debates with the audience whether universities should give preference to students from poorer backgrounds, whether a nurse should be paid more than a banker, and whether it is right to bribe people to be healthy.

edX 
Sandel is currently teaching his Justice course on edX.
On April 29, 2013, the philosophy department faculty of San Jose State University addressed an open letter to Sandel protesting the use of MOOCs (massively open online courses) such as his Justice course. Sandel publicly responded: "The worry that the widespread use of online courses will damage departments in public universities facing budgetary pressures is a legitimate concern that deserves serious debate, at edX and throughout higher education. The last thing I want is for my online lectures to be used to undermine faculty colleagues at other institutions."

Other teaching 
Sandel also co-teaches, with Douglas Melton, the seminar "Ethics and Biotechnology", which considers the ethical implications of a variety of biotechnological procedures and possibilities.

Authorship
Sandel is the author of several publications, including Democracy's Discontent and Public Philosophy. Public Philosophy is a collection of his own previously published essays examining the role of morality and justice in American political life. He offers a commentary on the roles of moral values and civic community in the American electoral process—a much-debated aspect of the 2004 US election cycle and of current political discussion.

Sandel gave the 2009 Reith Lectures on "A New Citizenship" on BBC Radio, addressing the "prospect for a new politics of the common good". The lectures were delivered in London on May 18, Oxford on May 21, Newcastle upon Tyne on May 26, and Washington, DC, in early June, 2009.

He is also the author of the book What Money Can't Buy: The Moral Limits of Markets (2012), which argues some desirable things—such as body organs and the right to kill endangered species—should not be traded for cash.  In the book, Sandel argues that stimulating a market-oriented approach in people may lead to relaxation or even corruption of their moral values.

Citing Michael Young's work as a precedent (he coined the term "meritocracy"), and developing a line of thought shared with Daniel Markovits's The Meritocracy Trap, Michael Sandel in his 2020 book The Tyranny of Merit makes a case for overhauling western neo-liberalism.  Elite institutions including the Ivy League and Wall Street have corrupted our virtue, according to Sandel, and our sense of who deserves power.    Ongoing stalled social mobility and increasing inequality are laying bare the crass delusion of the American Dream, and the promise "you can make it if you want and try". The latter, according to Sandel, is the main culprit of the anger and frustration which brought some Western countries towards populism.

Personal life

Sandel is married to fellow Harvard professor Kiku Adatto.

Public service
Sandel served on the George W. Bush administration's President's Council on Bioethics.

Awards and honors

1985: Harvard-Radcliffe Phi Beta Kappa Teaching Prize
2012: Financial Times and Goldman Sachs Business Book of the Year Award, shortlist, What Money Can't Buy: The Moral Limits of Markets
2012: Foreign Policy magazine Top Global Thinker
2014: Honorary doctorate, Utrecht University
2018: Premio Princesa de Asturias de las Ciencias Sociales

Works

 
 
 French translation: 
 Spanish translation: 
 
 
 German translation: 
Spanish translation: 
 
 
 Translated into Chinese, Spanish, French, Greek, Japanese, Korean, Portuguese, Russian, and Vietnamese editions; see the article on the book for the full citations.
 
 German translation: 
 French translation:  
 Also translated into Spanish and other languages.

See also

American philosophy
List of American philosophers

References

External links

 Harvard University Bio
 Michael Sandel: On the Good Life on Berggruen Institute's YouTube channel
 Podcast interview with Nigel Warburton on Philosophy Bites on What Shouldn't Be Sold
 "The Case Against Perfection: Ethics in the Age of Genetic Engineering, by Michael J. Sandel (2007)" by N. Antonios at the Embryo Project Encyclopedia
 Podcast interview with Nigel Warburton on Ethics Bites on the topic of Genetic Enhancement in Sports
 The President's Council on Bioethics
 A page of links relating to the 2009 Reith Lectures
 What's The Right Thing To Do? on Harvard University's YouTube channel
 Fairness and the Big Society Debate on BBC
 Justice: a series of lectures by Michael Sandel on BBC
 
 
 Talk and Q&A on "Populism, Trump and the Future of Democracy" held at The American Academy in Berlin, April 2018
 "Michael Sandel, philosopher", Desert Island Discs, BBC Radioo 4, October 2021.

21st-century American philosophers
Jewish philosophers
American political philosophers
American Rhodes Scholars
Harvard University faculty
Fellows of the American Academy of Arts and Sciences
Brandeis University alumni
Alumni of Balliol College, Oxford
20th-century American Jews
1953 births
Living people
Harvard Extension School faculty
20th-century American philosophers
21st-century American Jews